Alonzo L. Waters (September 6, 1893 – March 13, 1980) was an American politician who served in the New York State Assembly from the Orleans district from 1949 to 1965.

References

1893 births
1980 deaths
Republican Party members of the New York State Assembly
20th-century American politicians